Andrew Neil James McKenzie  is a molecular biologist and group leader in the Medical Research Council (MRC) Laboratory of Molecular Biology (LMB).

Education
McKenzie was educated at the University of London where he was awarded a PhD for research on the immune response of the bluebottle fly (Calliphora vomitoria), covering both humoral immunity and cell-mediated immunity.

Research and career
McKenzie's research investigates how the innate immune system and adaptive immune system protect the body from infection, but can also lead to inflammation and pathology.  He has defined and characterised how biological networks orchestrate responses to pathogens and how dysregulation of these biological pathways can lead to diseases such as asthma and allergy.

His identification of the cytokine Interleukin 13 and the subsequent unearthing of its central role in allergic asthma led to his discovery of type-2 innate lymphoid cells (ILC2). These cells secrete large quantities of cytokines and represent a new druggable biological target for intervention in inflammation and infection.

Awards and honours
McKenzie was elected a Fellow of the Royal Society (FRS) in 2017 and a Fellow of the Academy of Medical Sciences (FMedSci) in 2011.

References

Fellows of the Royal Society
Fellows of the Academy of Medical Sciences (United Kingdom)
Living people
Year of birth missing (living people)